Delino Lamont DeShields (born January 15, 1969), also nicknamed "Bop", is an American former professional baseball second baseman. He played for 13 seasons in Major League Baseball (MLB) for the Montreal Expos, Los Angeles Dodgers, St. Louis Cardinals, Baltimore Orioles, and Chicago Cubs between 1990 and 2002. He managed the Louisville Bats in the Cincinnati Reds organization from 2012–2017. His son Delino DeShields Jr. plays for the Atlanta Braves and his daughter Diamond DeShields plays for the Chicago Sky.

Early life
DeShields was born in Seaford, Delaware where he was raised by his mother and grandmother. He was an All-American in baseball and basketball at Seaford High School. DeShields signed a letter of intent to play college basketball at Villanova University. However, after being selected as the 12th overall pick in the 1987 MLB draft, he chose a career in baseball; he signed for $130,000 with the Montreal Expos.

Career
DeShields made his Major League debut on Opening Day of the 1990 season for the Expos. He recorded four hits in his debut, the most for a debutant in the National League since Mack Jones 29 seasons earlier. He became the regular second baseman for the Expos in 1990, finishing in second place for the NL Rookie of the Year award. He suffered from a sophomore slump in 1991, but went on to post his two best years in 1992 and 1993, hitting .294 and averaging 45 stolen bases.

On November 19, 1993, DeShields was traded to the Los Angeles Dodgers for then-prospect Pedro Martínez. In retrospect, this is considered one of the worst trades in Dodgers history. DeShields hit .241 during his three years in Los Angeles, while Martinez went on to win three Cy Young Awards and established himself among the greatest pitchers of all time.

In 1996, DeShields signed as a free agent with the St. Louis Cardinals, and later played with the Baltimore Orioles and Chicago Cubs. In 2001, he was the last out in Hideo Nomo's no-hitter against the Baltimore Orioles.

After playing career
DeShields is the co-founder of the Urban Baseball League. He also travels with Oil Can Boyd to promote baseball in African American communities.

DeShields was the manager for the Dayton Dragons, a single-A affiliate of the Cincinnati Reds organization for the 2011 and 2012 seasons. On December 12, 2012, it was announced that DeShields would become the manager for the Cincinnati Reds AA minor league team, the Pensacola Blue Wahoos for the 2013 season. On December 1, 2014 DeShields became manager of the Louisville Bats, replacing Jim Riggleman.

Personal
DeShields is married to Michelle Elliott DeShields, an educator and television host for the PBS series Georgia Traveler airing on Georgia Public Broadcasting. He has five children; four from his first marriage, Delino Jr., Diamond, D'Angelo and Denim; and one from his current marriage, Delaney. Two children from his earlier marriage followed in his footsteps and became professional athletes. Delino Jr. was an outfielder who played for the Cincinnati Reds of Major League Baseball (MLB)  and Diamond is a basketball player for the Dallas Wings of the Women's National Basketball Association (WNBA).

Highlights
 Named State Baseball Player of the Year in 1986.
 Placed second in Rookie of the Year Award voting in 1990
 Led National League in triples (14, 1997)
 Nine-time top 10 finisher among NL base stealers (1990–98)
 His career 463 stolen bases ranks him 44th on the all-time list
 Wore his socks just below the knee, to honor the players of the defunct Negro leagues
 Inducted into the Delaware Sports Museum and Hall of Fame in 2006.
 Inducted into the Eastern Shore Baseball Foundation Hall of Fame and Museum in 2010.

See also
 List of Major League Baseball career stolen bases leaders
 List of Major League Baseball annual triples leaders
 List of second-generation Major League Baseball players

References

External links

Delino DeShields Baseball Biography

1969 births
Living people
African-American baseball coaches
African-American baseball managers
African-American baseball players
American expatriate baseball players in Canada
Arkansas Travelers players
Baltimore Orioles players
Baseball coaches from Delaware
Baseball players from Delaware
Billings Mustangs managers
Bowie Baysox players
Chicago Cubs players
Cincinnati Reds coaches
Delmarva Shorebirds players
Frederick Keys players
Gulf Coast Expos players
Indianapolis Indians players
Jacksonville Expos players
Jamestown Expos players
Los Angeles Dodgers players
Louisville Bats managers
Major League Baseball first base coaches
Major League Baseball second basemen
Montreal Expos players
People from Seaford, Delaware
Rockford Expos players
St. Louis Cardinals players
Baseball players from Atlanta
Sportspeople from College Park, Georgia
21st-century African-American people
20th-century African-American sportspeople